D. aurea  may refer to:
 Dalbergia aurea, a legume species found only in Madagascar
 Diplommatina aurea, a land snail species endemic to Palau

See also
 Aurea (disambiguation)